Amyntas son of Nicolaus; perhaps the brother of Pantauchus, and thus from Aloros was a Macedonian general and a satrap of Bactria.

References
 Who's who in the age of Alexander the Great (Amyntas [9]) 

Generals of Alexander the Great
Satraps of the Alexandrian Empire
Ancient Greek generals
Ancient Macedonian generals
Ancient Alorites
4th-century BC Macedonians
People from Imathia